Each year the Wisconsin Miss Basketball award is given to the person chosen as the best high school girls basketball player in the U.S. state of Wisconsin.

The award has been given since 1983. Winners are chosen by the Wisconsin Basketball Coaches Association at the time of their annual All-State selections. Most of the award winners have gone on to play at the highest levels of college basketball, and some have gone on to play in the Women's National Basketball Association.

Voting is done by the members of the WBCA.  Each member can vote and the winner is determined by the player with the most votes.  Coaches may not put votes in for players on their own team.  If it is done anyway, the vote is thrown out. The award can only be given to a Senior, This has been in effect since 2003 as Mistie Bass won the award 3 years in a row.

Annual Award Winners

See also
Wisconsin Mr. Basketball Award

References

Mr. and Miss Basketball awards
Basketball in Wisconsin
Women in Wisconsin
Lists of people from Wisconsin
Basketball players from Wisconsin
American women's basketball players
Miss Basketball